Ewout Gouw (born 6 January 1995) is a Dutch professional footballer who plays as a midfielder for Dade County FC in United States. The same club he co-founded to create opportunities for working players in the community of Dade County.

Career

Club career
Gouw signed his first professional contract with Vitesse at the age of 18. Following his release from boyhood club Vitesse in June 2017, Gouw joined Belgian side Tubize ahead of the 2017–18 campaign. On 12 August 2017, Gouw made his Tubize debut during their 1–1 draw with Westerlo, featuring for the entire 90 minutes.

United States
In January 2019, Gouw moved to United States, San Diego, to work on his professional career outside football and also joined ASC San Diego in the NPSL Southwestern Conference. Gouw was studying a MBA degree to prepare for a management career in any sort of organization in- and outside sports.

On 17 December 2019 it was confirmed, that Gouw had joined Miami Dutch Lions FC. Beside his player duties, Gouw would also work as a general manager for the club, mainly responsible for setting up the Miami Dutch Lions Training School, player management and all the marketing-related events including sponsors, marketing campaigns, budget allocation, player management, and operational activities. Gouw would work closely with the management team and serve as a liaison between the club and ownership in Houston and the Netherlands.

Dade County FC
In September 2021 Gouw would co-found Dade County Football Club and start acting as the General Manager of the club. From the ground up the team started with open practices for local players and on January 23, 2022, would its first official Tryout. Ewout will play as midfielder in the club's first UPSL Season under the lead of coach Martin Becerra.

Career statistics

References

External links
 

1995 births
Living people
People from Ede, Netherlands
Footballers from Gelderland
Association football midfielders
Dutch footballers
Dutch expatriate footballers
Challenger Pro League players
SBV Vitesse players
A.F.C. Tubize players
SV TEC players
Expatriate footballers in Belgium
Expatriate soccer players in the United States
Dutch expatriate sportspeople in Belgium
Dutch expatriate sportspeople in the United States